Roderick McKenzie Petrie (born 22 April 1956) is a Scottish football executive, who is currently the president of the Scottish Football Association. He was the chairman and chief executive of Hibernian F.C. for over 20 years. Petrie, who is a qualified chartered accountant and trained with Ernst & Young, has also served on the boards of the Scottish Football Association and Scottish Premier League.

Career
Petrie trained to be a chartered accountant with Ernst & Young, eventually becoming an audit partner in 13 years with the firm. He was then managing director of investment bank Quayle Munro for over six years.

Hibernian
Petrie, who had advised Tom Farmer throughout his rescue of Hibernian FC (Hibs) from receivership in 1991, joined the club's board of directors in 1996 and was appointed managing director in 1997.

Petrie was involved in the creation of the Scottish Premier League, but Hibs themselves missed the first season in the new top flight of Scottish football due to being relegated to the First Division in 1998. The club won the First Division at the first attempt in season 1998–99 and returned to the top division. A new, multimillion-pound main (West) Stand was built, to add to the new North (Famous Five) and South Stands already built during Sir Tom's ownership.

Most Scottish football clubs hit financial difficulty in 2002 when the television broadcast deal with Sky Sports ended after the league and broadcaster failed to reach agreement on a renewal. Hibernian was one of the first Scottish clubs to react to the new financial landscape, taking action to reduce costs as quickly as possible. However losses accrued and added to the loan taken to develop the new stand, the club saw its debt level increase.

Petrie, the only significant minority shareholder in Hibs, and the board explored options to reduce debt. Two options were identified: one was for the club to stay at Easter Road while increasing revenue; the second was to sell the Easter Road site to clear the club's debt and to share a proposed new ground in Midlothian with Edinburgh derby rivals Hearts, who also had significant financial problems. Hibs opened discussions with Hearts about the possibility of moving to Straiton, but this was met with a sceptical reaction by the Hibs support.

Hibs then appointed former player and manager Pat Stanton to act as an "honest broker" in a public consultation process that followed. The result of the consultation was that Hibs decided to stay at Easter Road. The club launched a campaign called Stand Up And Be Counted to engage with fans in an effort to increase revenues. Land behind the east side of Easter Road was sold by the parent company after the Club identified the footprint of land it wished to keep for future redevelopment. The sale, to a housing developer (Westpoint Homes), helped to reduce the club's debt to a more manageable level after the parent company forgave a significant sum owed to it by the club. The club continued to exercise prudence in its financial dealings, with tight control of costs.

Petrie was appointed Hibs chairman in December 2004, after the resignation of Ken Lewandowski. After the appointment of Tony Mowbray as Hibs manager in May 2004, Hibs made a trading profit in four consecutive years. Hibs also received significant transfer income for Garry O'Connor (£1.6M), Kevin Thomson (£2M), Scott Brown (£4.4M), Ivan Sproule (£0.5M), Steven Whittaker (£2M), and David Murphy (£1.5M) during this same period. Hibs also lost the services of Scottish internationalists Ian Murray, Derek Riordan and Gary Caldwell for little or no fee due to the expiry of their contracts.

Despite criticism, particularly after the resignation of John Collins, that he has not used enough of these revenues on increased spending on players, Petrie has argued that the club has increased the budget for player wages four times and invested in a new training ground in East Lothian, while also reducing the net debt to under £3M. Petrie's relationship with the Scottish media has also been a point of interest. Despite praise for his sure financial management, some journalists accused Petrie of being uncooperative.

Petrie resigned from his position as chief executive in April 2008 and was replaced by Scott Lindsay, but has retained his position as chairman. Petrie stated that Lindsay would take over the "day-to-day running of the club", while Petrie would retain control of "executive duties", including the negotiation of player contracts and setting the player budget. Hibs continued to break even in the 2009–10 season, although this was due to the sale of players offsetting a trading loss.

After manager John Hughes left the club by mutual consent in October 2010, Petrie received criticism from former player Paul Kane for his track record in appointing managers. The previous three managers – John Collins, Mixu Paatelainen and Hughes – had all left the club within 18 months of being appointed. Petrie was again criticised when Colin Calderwood was sacked after just over a year as Hibs manager. Hibs announced that two other directors, Scott Lindsay and Fyfe Hyland, would conduct the next recruitment process. After two years of declining attendances and financial losses, attendance stabilised in the 2012–13 season. Lindsay and Hyland both left the club during 2012, with other directors taking on their executive tasks.

Hibs continued to struggle on the field, culminating in their relegation to the Scottish Championship in 2014. Petrie, who had made Terry Butcher his seventh managerial appointment in 10 years as chairman during the 2013–14 season, pledged to continue as chairman while overseeing the introduction of Leeann Dempster as chief executive. A group of fans, led by former player Paul Kane, called on Petrie to resign.

Petrie left the Hibs board in July 2019, after American businessman Ronald Gordon acquired majority ownership of the club.

Scottish Football Association 
Petrie has served on the committees of the Scottish Football Association (SFA) since 1998. He was elected second vice-president in 2011 (under the presidency of Campbell Ogilvie), and then became first vice-president under Alan McRae. Petrie was himself elected SFA president in 2019, without any opposition. His election was criticised by John Collins, who said he felt there were other people who could offer greater "passion and knowledge". SFA chief executive Ian Maxwell defended Petrie, citing his long service and he claimed that Petrie was "misunderstood" by the public. Soon after his election as president, the SFA completed a deal to purchase Hampden Park from Queen's Park.

Petrie was nominated for a place on the UEFA executive committee in 2023.

Notes

References

1956 births
Living people
Chairmen and investors of football clubs in Scotland
Scottish chief executives
Scottish accountants
Hibernian F.C. directors and chairmen